The Saleen XP8 is a performance sport utility vehicle based on the Ford Explorer created by Saleen during the years 1998–2001. There were three prototype models, based on the 1997 Explorer XLT, which when viewed closely, has distinct characteristics apart from the production models (rear hatch design, taillights, and integrated license plate into the rear bumper). The Saleen XP8 comes in two wheel drive, or all wheel drive four-door configurations, packing either a 5.0-liter V-8, or a Saleen-developed supercharged 5.0-liter/286-horsepower V-8.

A six-cylinder version, the Saleen XP6, was also made in very limited quantities in 1998.

Production quantities 

There were approximately 125 Saleen XP8's created, although this number is widely disputed and to an extent, impossible to verify as Saleen has extremely limited records of this low production model. It has been said that approximately the first 20 XP8's were reserved for Saleen employees and executives, thus decreasing the available selection to the public even more.

Specifications 
Saleen lowered the Explorer about 2 inches, for both improved handling and appearance. Springs and shocks were replaced with the company's Racecraft components, and wheels upgraded to Saleen's own  genuine magnesium wheels wrapped by Pirelli 255/55SR18 Scorpion S/T radials.

The exterior appearance package was designed by Phil Frank and includes special front and rear fascia, side skirts, door cladding, roof-mounted rear wing, and carbon fiber trim. The cabin is treated to either a real wood or carbon fiber appearance package, depending upon color choice, as well as Saleen gauge faces and floor mats. A particularly nice, though pricey, option is Saleen/RECARO leather seating ($3950), offering 10-way power adjustment up front and hip-hugging support.

Engine
Bore & Stroke: 4in x 3in
Displacement: 5.0L / 302cid
Compression Ratio: 8.5:1
Horsepower: 222 hp / 4,200 rpm
Torque: 298 lb/ft / 3,000 rpm

Drive train
Transmission: 4-speed automatic

Brakes
ABS: Three channel, four-sensor system
Disc Brakes: Front & Rear
Front: 13in vented disc four piston caliper (optional)
These front disc brakes were eventually recalled and replaced with stock Explorer calipers, again due to lack of structural integrity.=

Additional options
 Carbon Fiber hood
 Premium Sound System
 Integrated LCD Display
 Saleen Recaro Leather interior

Saleen XP8

Engine
Bore & Stroke: 4in x 3in
Displacement: 5.0L / 302cid
Compression Ratio: 8.5:1
Horsepower: 286 hp / 4,200 rpm
Torque: 333 lb/ft / 3,000 rpm

Drive train
Transmission: 4 Speed automatic

Brakes
ABS: Three channel, four sensor system
Disc Brakes: Front & Rear
Front: 13in vented disc four piston caliper (optional)
These front disc brakes were eventually recalled and replaced with stock Explorer calipers, due to an unforeseen lack of structural integrity.

Additional options
 Carbon Fiber hood
 Premium Sound System
 Integrated LCD Display
 Saleen Recaro Leather interior

Saleen Explorer pricing
All prices are in USD
Saleen Explorer 5.0L 2WD base price: $37,990.00
Saleen Explorer 5.0L AWD base price: $45,990

Saleen/Recaro Leather Upgrade: $2989.00
Saleen 13" Brake System (N/A on 2WD): $2682.00 (Later recalled & replaced with stock Explorer brakes)
Saleen Lightweight Hood: $1750.00
Chrome Alloy Wheels: $935.00

Enclosed Transport to Dealer: $1500.00

Variation in models 
Saleen XP8's can vary dramatically in appearance and options as a result of Saleen farming the production of the XP8's (with the exception of only a few) to California bodyshops and Ford dealers. Many of the options available in Saleen XP8's, such as the carbon fiber composite hood, Saleen supercharger, and carbon fiber accents were installed outside of the Saleen Inc. compound.

Availability 
Saleen XP8's are now well past their final production date (2001), and as such, can only be purchased through online advertisements and car auction websites such as eBay Motors. Prices vary significantly due to condition, mileage, and most importantly, options installed. Sale prices can vary between $8,000 to $20,000 depending on the above.

Additionally, all performance and appearance parts for the XP8's have ceased production back in 2001. Parts are virtually impossible to find and purchase, and reproduction costs are skyhigh due to low demand and basically, the owner of the vehicle themselves footing the bill. Saleen XP8 parts are no longer available through Saleen whatsoever, even to owners.

This has led to what some owners describe as the "glass-slipper effect", as that if any substantial damage were to occur, replacement parts are not an option. Therefore, because of this and the very low production numbers to begin with of the XP8, the XP8 maintains a distinct allure to Ford enthusiasts unfound in many other vehicles.

Records 
The Saleen Book, an official book produced by Saleen detailing the history and production numbers of Saleen vehicles past and present, noticeably neglected to cover and feature the XP8. Only in the owner registry listed in the book (compiled information of the original owner of each Saleen vehicle) did it mention a few select XP8's. 

As such, the Saleen Explorer XP6/XP8 Owner Registry Database was created on ExplorerX, an active Ford Explorer enthusiast website to maintain records. Although unofficial, it remains the only and most active list dedicated to Saleen XP6 and XP8 vehicles. An active XP6 and XP8 community resides there.

See also
Saleen
Saleen XP6

References

External links
The Ultimate Saleen XP8 Guide
Biography of the Final Saleen Explorer XP8 Ever Made

Sport utility vehicles
XP8